WJIK is a Christian radio station licensed to Fulton, Alabama, broadcasting on 89.3 MHz FM. WJIK is owned by Family Worship Center Church, Inc.

History
The station was originally owned by Penfold Communications, airing a Christian format, and began broadcasting in 2011. The station was silent for periods in 2012, 2015, and 2017, due to technical issues. In 2017, the station was donated to Family Worship Center Church, Inc.

References

External links
WJIK's website

JIK
Radio stations established in 2011
2011 establishments in Alabama